John Jeremiah McRaith (December 6, 1934 – March 19, 2017) was an American prelate of the Roman Catholic Church. He served as bishop of the Diocese of Owensboro in Kentucky from 1982 to 2009.

Biography

Early life 
John McRaith was born on December 6, 1934, in Hutchinson, Minnesota to Arthur Luke McRaith and Marie (née Hanley) McRaith. He grew up on a farm in that community. McRaith attended St. John's Preparatory School in Collegeville, Minnesota, then went to Loras College and St. Bernard's Seminary, both in Dubuque, Iowa.

Priesthood 
McRaith was ordained a priest for the Diocese of New Ulm on February 21, 1960. He served as chancellor and vicar general of the diocese, and as executive director of the National Catholic Rural Life Conference from 1971 to 1978.

Bishop of Owensboro 
On October 23, 1982, McRaith was appointed the third bishop of the Diocese of Owensboro by Pope John Paul II. He received his episcopal consecration on December 15, 1982, from Archbishop Thomas Kelly, with Bishops Henry Soenneker and Raymond Lucker serving as co-consecrators. He established the diocesan newspaper, The Western Kentucky Catholic, in 1984.

Having grown up on a farm, McRaith was very interested in sustainable agriculture and the issues of rural life.  He owned a farm where he grew vegetables and took visitors on hay rides. He led the Subcommittee on Food, Agriculture and Rural Concerns for the U.S. Conference of Catholic Bishops (USCCB) and testified to a US Senate committee on family farms in 1990.

At a 1992 USCCB meeting, the bishops adopted a McRaith proposal to create a task force to deal with the sexual abuse of minors by clergy.  McRaith was a board member for Brescia University, the Daniel Pitino Shelter for the homeless and the McAuley Free Clinic, all in Owensboro, and the Lourdes Hospital Foundation in Paducah, Kentucky.

Retirement and legacy 
On January 5, 2009, Pope Benedict VI accepted McRaith's early retirement for health reasons as bishop of Owensboro.  McRaith explained, "I do not have a life-threatening illness, but my doctors have advised me to slow down."

John McRaith died in Owensboro on March 19, 2017, at age 82.

References

1934 births
2017 deaths
20th-century Roman Catholic bishops in the United States
Loras College alumni
People from Hutchinson, Minnesota
Roman Catholic Diocese of New Ulm
Roman Catholic Diocese of Owensboro
Religious leaders from Kentucky
Catholics from Minnesota
21st-century Roman Catholic bishops in the United States